Tai Po Methodist School, founded in 1992, was the first Protestant, full-time primary school belonging to the Methodist Church, Hong Kong. There are 30 classes in total, and about 1,000 students and 47 teachers. Miss Ouyang Meichan is the current principal.

See also
 Education in Hong Kong
 List of primary schools in Hong Kong

External links

 

Primary schools in Hong Kong
Christian schools in Hong Kong